The 2002 Pan American Men's Handball Championship was the tenth edition of the tournament, held in Buenos Aires, Argentina from 10 to 14 July 2002. It acted as the American qualifying tournament for the 2003 World Championship, where the top three placed team qualied.

Preliminary round
All times are local (UTC−3).

Group A

Group B

Knockout stage

Bracket

Fifth place bracket

5–8th place semifinals

Semifinals

Seventh place game

Fifth place game

Third place game

Final

Final ranking

External links
Results on todor66.com

Pan American Men's Handball Championship
2002 in handball
2002 in Argentine sport
International handball competitions hosted by Argentina
July 2002 sports events in South America
Sports competitions in Buenos Aires